Coleotechnites australis is a moth of the family Gelechiidae. It is found in North America, where it has been recorded from Alabama, Arkansas, Florida, Louisiana and Mississippi.

Adults have been recorded on wing in March and from May to September.

The larvae feed on Juniperus virginiana.

References

Moths described in 1963
Coleotechnites